"I'm Alive" is the debut single by London-based DJ/producers Stretch Silvester (Stuart Collins) and Jules Vern (Julian Peake) under the name Stretch & Vern. Containing a looped sample from "Boogie Wonderland" by Earth, Wind & Fire, it was well received by music critics, peaking at number six on the UK Singles Chart and number-one on the UK Dance Chart. It was also featured on Coca-Cola advert campaigns. In other European countries, it peaked at number 21 in Ireland, number 23 in the Netherlands and number 29 in Sweden, where it also topped the Swedsh Dance chart. On the Eurochart Hot 100, it reached number 16 in September 1996. Outside Europe, the single peaked at number two on the Billboard Hot Dance Club Play chart in the US and at number 65 in Australia. 

British electronic dance and clubbing magazine Mixmag ranked "I'm Alive" number 28 in its list of the best singles of 1996.

Critical reception
Larry Flick from Billboard described the song as a "quirky dance twirler" and explained further that "this track is rife with the kitschy allure of a novelty hit", and "fashion a jittery disco beat beneath a tongue-twisting female rap." David Bennun from The Guardian complimented it as "gleefully manic" and "brilliant". A reviewer from Music Week declared it as "alarmingly infectious". Tim Jeffery from the RM Dance Update gave it four out of five, adding, "This is so certain to be a huge hit that you probably wouldn't even get odds at Ladbrokes on it. It's a similar idea to the Bucketheads in that it's basically a disco pastiche made up of other people's records, particularly the large chunks of 'Boogie Wonderland', but it's the way this has been put together that's so special. Just try not dancing to this. Already snapped up by a major, copies on this label will be hard to find until it gets a proper release but you're certain to hear this everywhere you go." Another editor, James Hyman, noted its "I'm alive, the man with the second face and I'm ready y'all to rock the space" hook, and concluded that the song "has already caused club carnage and will do the same in the national charts."

Music video
A black-and-white music video was produced to promote the single, directed by Katya Nelhams-Wright and featuring an early appearance of actress Jaime Murray.

Track listing
 7", UK (1996)
A. "I'm Alive" (Eat Me Edit)
B. "I'm Alive" (Eat Me Edit)

 12" single, UK (1996)
A1. "I'm Alive" (12" Original)
B1. "I'm Alive" (Fat Boy Comes Alive)
B2. "I'm Alive" (Moonmen Mix)

 CD single, UK & Europe (1996)
"I'm Alive" (7" Eat Me Edit) – 3:06
"I'm Alive" (12" Original) – 7:16
"I'm Alive" (Fat Boy Comes Alive) – 5:05
"I'm Alive" (Moonmen Mix) – 9:08

Charts

Weekly charts

Year-end charts

References

 

1996 songs
1996 debut singles
FFRR Records singles
London Records singles
British house music songs
Songs written by Allee Willis
Songs written by Jon Lind
Black-and-white music videos